Public High School Raniganj is a government school in rural Bihar in India. It is situated in the Raniganj village of Gaya district of Bihar, and Year Of Recognition 1980 Its affiliated from Bihar School Examination Board.

References 

High schools and secondary schools in Bihar
Gaya district
Educational institutions in India with year of establishment missing